Cathy Kelly (born 12 September 1966) is an Irish former journalist and writer of women's fiction since 1997. She has gained international recognition with her popular fiction novels, which are published globally in many languages. In 2001, her novel Someone Like You won the Romantic Novel of the Year Award by the Romantic Novelists' Association. Kelly is one of the most successful female authors to come out of Ireland since Maeve Binchy, having once outsold both Dan Brown and J. K. Rowling in the UK.

Biography

Early life and career
Born in Belfast but raised in Dublin, she studied at a convent school. Kelly initially worked for 13 years as a newspaper journalist with the Sunday World, where she worked in news, and features, along with spending time as an agony aunt and film critic.

However, her overwhelming love was always fiction and she published her first international bestseller, Woman To Woman, in 1997. She did not become a full-time writer until she had written another two books (She’s The One and Never Too Late) and finally decided to leave the world of journalism in 2001.

Someone Like You, What She Wants, Just Between Us and Best of Friends followed in successive years. Always and Forever was her first hardback number one and then topped the overall UK bestseller list during October 2005, displacing Dan Brown and J. K. Rowling who had been on top most weeks.

Her books Lessons in Heartbreak and Homecoming were shortlisted for the Eason Irish Popular Fiction Book of the Year at the Irish Book Awards. Once in a Lifetime topped the UK bestsellers for Kelly again, for multiple weeks. In March 2011, Homecoming achieved the same feat. Her recent short story collection, Christmas Magic, was Christmas number one in Ireland. She is hugely popular around the world: a number one bestseller in Australia and New Zealand, where she tours annually, and published in many different languages.

Kelly's trademark is warm story-telling; she writes books that deal with themes ranging from relationships and marriage to depression and loss, but always with an uplifting message and strong female characters at the heart.

Philanthropy
Kelly is involved with many charities and has been an Ambassador for UNICEF Ireland since 2005. She works as a Global Parent for UNICEF, which means raising funds and awareness for children orphaned by or living with HIV/AIDs. Her role has seen her visit Rwanda and Mozambique.

Television

In 2022, Kelly appeared on the fifth series of the Irish version of Dancing With the Stars. She was the first contestant to be eliminated.

Personal life
Kelly lives in Enniskerry, County Wicklow with her family and three dogs.

Bibliography

Single novels
Woman to Woman (1997)
She's the One (1998)
Never Too Late (1999)
Someone Like You (2000)
What She Wants (2001)
Just Between Us (2002)
Best of Friends (2003)
Always and Forever (2005)
Past Secrets (2006)
Lessons in Heartbreak (2008)
Once in a Lifetime (2009) 
The Perfect Holiday (2010) 
Homecoming (2010)
The House on Willow Street (2012) 
The Honey Queen (2013)
It Started With Paris (2014)
Between Sisters (2015)
Secrets of a Happy Marriage (2017)

Novellas
Letter from Chicago (2002)

Collections
Christmas Magic (2011)

References and sources

External links
 Official website
 Cathy's Official Facebook Page
 Cathy's Twitter Page
 Cathy Kelly on Fantasticfiction.com
 Cathy Kelly's author profile on Simon & Schuster
 BBC raw Quick Reads – The Perfect Holiday by Cathy Kelly 

1966 births
Living people
Irish film critics
Irish women critics
Irish women novelists
Irish women journalists
Journalists from Belfast
RoNA Award winners
20th-century Irish novelists
21st-century Irish novelists
20th-century Irish women writers
21st-century Irish women writers
Women romantic fiction writers
Women film critics